Line S6 is a rapid transit line connecting Nanjing and Jurong in Jiangsu Province, China. It has opened on 28 December 2021. The line operates with a mixed express and local services using passing loops to allow for express trains to pass local ones.

The line started construction on December 21, 2018. The line is a joint venture between Nanjing Metro and the Jurong local government.

Stations

References 

Nanjing Metro lines